Ballypickas GAA is a Gaelic Athletic Association hurling club in County Laois, Ireland. Ballypickas is located near Abbeyleix and the club grounds are at the quaintly named Cobbler's Hill. The club colours are green and gold hoops.

History
The club has won many honours over the year's including the Laois Intermediate Hurling Championship twice, in 1937 and 1964.

Ballypickas holds the joint record for wins in the Laois Junior Hurling Championship with no less than six titles in the grade. The first of these came back in 1931, with the most recent in 1994. The other wins were in 1936, 1955, 1963 and 1985.

Ballypickas returned to winning ways in 2007 with a great win in the final of the Laois Junior B Hurling Championship over The Harps and a win over St. Fintans, Colt in the final of the Laois Junior C Hurling Championship to complete a memorable championship double.

Ballypickas hurling players usually play their football with Spink or Ballyroan.

Achievements
 Laois Intermediate Hurling Championships: (2) 1937, 1964
 Laois Junior Hurling Championships: (7) 1931, 1936, 1955, 1963, 1985, 1994, 2017, 2021
 Leinster Special Junior Hurling Championship Winners (1) 2015
 Laois Junior B Hurling Championships: (1) 2007
 Laois Junior C Hurling Championships: (1) 2007

References

Gaelic games clubs in County Laois
Hurling clubs in County Laois